Jezioro Białe is a lake in Poland, Warmian-Masurian Voivodship, in Gostynin County, with an area of the lake 1.425 km².

See also 
 Jezioro Białe (disambiguation)

References 

Lakes of Poland
Lakes of Warmian-Masurian Voivodeship
Underwater diving sites in Poland